Majority Report was an American feminist newspaper published in New York, N.Y. from May 1971 to April 1979. Founded by the Woman's Strike Coalition, the periodical described itself as "A Feminist Newspaper Serving the Women of New York." Majority Report had an all-woman staff who were all dedicated on reporting feminist news that weren't otherwise covered by major publications such as The New York Times. It published articles on topics such as equal rights legislation, information on services regarding divorce and daycare, and various reviews and critiques on sexist media representations.

References 

1971 establishments in New York City
Feminist newspapers
Publications disestablished in 1979
Newspapers published in New York (state)